Constant Guillaume Van Crombrugghe (14 October 1789 – 1 December 1865) was a Flemish canon and founder of several religious orders:  Josephites or Fathers Jozefieten (1817) and Subsidiaries of the Sisters of Mary and Joseph. The latter congregation was founded in 1838 split in the Ladies of Mary and the Sisters of St. Jozef of Jozefienen. He also founded The Daughters of Mary and Joseph which founded Coloma Convent Girls' School in 1869 and is still attended by students in Croydon, England.

He came from a well-established and affluent family, and his father, Ghislain-François, was a prosperous brewer in Grammont. His mother, Cécile-Joseph, was a powerful figure in the lace industry and came from a well-known and prominent Grammont family.

The order established several schools in Belgium and St George's College, Weybridge in England.

Van Crombrugghe was also a member of the National Congress, the constituent assembly at which the Belgian Constitution was written.

Functions
 Canon of Saint-Bavochapter Cathedral, 1830
 Archdeacon of the chapter,  1863
 Officer of the  order of Leopold, by Royal Decree of 1863.
 Iron cross

References

External links 
 Constant Van Crombrugghe in ODIS - Online Database for Intermediary Structures

1789 births
1865 deaths
Flemish priests
Canons (priests)
19th-century Belgian Roman Catholic priests
Founders of Catholic religious communities
Members of the National Congress of Belgium
People from Geraardsbergen